Mikhail Yakovlev may refer to:

 Mikhail Yakovlev (footballer, born 1892), Russian football player
 Mikhail Yakovlev (footballer, born 1999), Russian football player